The Cossack-class corvettes were two 20-gun first-class corvettes, initially under construction in Britain for the Imperial Russian Navy. These ships were seized on 5 April 1854, after the outbreak of the Crimean War.

History
The Imperial Russian Navy had ordered two ships, to be named Vityaz and Voyn, for the sum of £46,198 (including £16,750 for the machinery) for both ships. After their seizure from the builders,  was bought for £9,591 (including £4,187 for the machinery) plus £715 for excess of tonnage on the ship , £2,206 for modifications made for British service.  was bought for £16,607 (including £4,187 for the machinery) plus £715 for excessive tonnage and £1,883 in modifications for British service.  The ships' modifications and fittings were completed at Chatham Dockyard between 1854 and 1855.

Characteristics
The two Cossack-class ships had eighteen 8in-guns on the upper deck, as well as two 68 pdr-pivot guns. Their crew complement was 270.

Ships

References

Corvette classes
Cossack